South Twin (Peak) is one of two main peaks that comprise The Twins massif located at the northeast corner of the Columbia Icefield in Jasper National Park, Alberta, Canada. South Twin is the eighth-highest peak in the Canadian Rockies. 

There are two other more minor peaks within The Twins massif and they are known as Twins Tower (first ascent in 1938) and West Twin (first ascent in 1975). West Twin's picture is in the Gallery below and a picture of Twins Tower can be found in the North Twin article.  All four of these peaks are listed in the 11,000ers.

The massif was named The Twins in 1898 by J. Norman Collie and Hugh M. Stutfield.  The decision to name the peaks separately was approved February 28, 1980.

The mountain was named in 1898 by J. Norman Collie and Hugh M. Stutfield.

Routes

The normal route is a ski mountaineering climb on the eastern slopes of North Twin, and then a traverse to the South Twin, although an ice axe is recommended for the narrow connecting ridge as well as the summit ridge.

References

Gallery

Three-thousanders of Alberta
Winston Churchill Range
Mountains of Jasper National Park